Fraternities and sororities exist for high school students as well as college students. Like their college counterparts, most have Greek letter names. Although there were countless local high school fraternities and sororities with only one or two chapters, many secondary fraternities founded in the nineteenth, and twentieth, century in the United States grew into national organizations with a highly evolved governing structure and regularly chartered chapters in multiple regions. Many of the local chapters of these national fraternities were not tied to (or affiliated with) individual high schools but were instead area based, often drawing membership from multiple high schools in a given area.

History
High school fraternities and sororities were inspired by and modeled after Greek-letter organizations which became prevalent in North American colleges and universities during the nineteenth century (Owen 492). In some respects, these fraternities and sororities are designed to better prepare individuals for college-level fraternities. Known active groups are indicated in bold, while known dormant groups are inset and indicated by italics.

General fraternities include, or included:
The first known high school fraternity was Torch and Dagger in Council Bluffs, Iowa, founded in 1859. This organization existed with lapses from 1861 to 1866 and again from 1880 to 1893. In 1900 it was renamed  - Omega Eta Tau and began expanding nationally. 
 - Gamma Sigma was organized in October 1869 at Brockport Normal School (then a high school-level institution, but now a college). Gamma Sigma also became the first International High School Fraternity when it chartered a chapter in Niagara Falls, Ontario, Canada in late 1927, the Alpha Zeta chapter. 
LaSalle Sr. High School in Niagara Falls New York was also home to multiple fraternities and sororities, dating back to the 1950s. The school itself recognized these programs up until the late 1960s as group photo's were included in the yearbooks of the time. these included Sigma Psi, Gamma Sigma, and Omega Delta, listed as male fraternities. Female sororities included Xi Gamma Rho, Delta Chi, and Theta Chi Omicron  
 - Alpha Zeta came into existence at the Union Classical Institute in Schenectady, New York (associated with Union College, home of the college fraternity movement) on December 8, 1869.
 - Alpha Phi (high school fraternity) followed one year later at the Colgate Academy (connected with Colgate University).
 - Beta Delta (high school sorority) founded in Shreveport, Louisiana in 1926.
 - Gamma Alpha (high school fraternity) founded in Baton Rouge, Louisiana at Baton Rouge High School in 1914.
 - Gamma Theta (high school sorority) founded in Baton Rouge, Louisiana at Baton Rouge High School in 1931.
Cum Laude Society (high school honors society) was founded in 1906 as Alpha Delta Tau, at the Tome School in Maryland. It adopted its present name in the 1950s. 
 - Delta Epsilon Phi  (high school honors, German)
 - Delta Sigma fraternity, a secondary school fraternity founded in 1897 at Lewis Institute in Chicago, Illinois
 - Kappa Alpha Pi, a secondary school fraternity founded in 1904 in Chicago, Illinois.
 - Omega Gamma Delta, a high school fraternity founded in 1902 in Brooklyn, New York. Currently operates adult chapters.
 - Omega Nu (sorority) was founded in 1897 at San Jose High School. The group continues with 12 active chapters as a service organization.
 - Pi Phi (fraternity) was founded in 1878 at Rochester Free Academy (associated with University of Rochester). Pi Phi spread to more than 110 chapters before lapsing into solely alumni chapters in the 1980s. 
 - Phi Sigma Chi, founded on November 28, 1900, in Zanesville, OH, may have chartered the most chapters of any high school fraternity: 117. 
 - Theta Kappa Sigma (high school sorority) founded in 1932 at the Stamford Collegiate Institute (high school) in Niagara Falls, Ontario, Canada. 
 - Theta Kappa Omega, founded 
In 1988, West Philadelphia High School became home of ATOPHI Fraternity, a local high school fraternity that was not tied to or affiliated with a local college or national fraternity, although inspired by the Black Greek-lettered fraternities and sororities. With the help of 4-5 others, Tony Dphax King (from University City) led the organization as president and introduced the fraternity to Temple University in 1990 - its first university chapter which included Orloff Phillips from Bethlehem, Pa. and eight others.

There were a number of Jewish high school fraternities. These include, or included:
  - Sigma Alpha Rho, founded in 1917
  - Aleph Zadik Aleph 
 B'nai B'rith Girls 
 - Iota Phi, sorority, high school, dormant. 
 - Phi Beta, fraternity, high school and preparatory schools for boys, founded 1920, dormant?  
 - Phi Sigma Beta, high school fraternity, 1910, became  collegiate fraternity.
  - Pi Upsilon Phi, high school fraternity, dormant? Its Sigma chapter was at Syracuse.
  - Sigma Theta Pi, Jewish high school girls, founded circa 1909 or earlier, dormant? This source notes the high school focus, accessed 27 Jan 2020.
  - Upsilon Lambda Phi, founded April 5, 1916, dormant? Publication was The Hour Glass. ''Most of the American secondary fraternities that were successful in the twentieth century had national governing bodies, produced regular publications and convened in regular (often annual) national conventions. They also each possessed a secret ritual and handshake and a Greek-letter name which, like college fraternities was usually derived from the abbreviation of a secret Greek motto. These groups were identified by a coat-of-arms and members wore distinctive fraternity badges or pins.

In the 1900s, some state governments banned fraternities and sororities in public schools, driving them underground, or out of existence.  California, for example, passed a law banning them in 1906.

See also
List of hazing deaths in the United States

Temple News, an article about a college brawl between two fraternities titled "Noon Time Diversion" written between 1991 and 1995.

References

 Owen, William Bishop. "The good of  High School Fraternities" The School Review Vol. 14 No. 7 492–504. The University of Chicago Press, 1906.
 Sigma Alpha Rho Handbook, 9th Edition
 Perkins, Glen O. "The good of Fraternities and Sororities in the Tucson High School" The School Review, Vol. 31, No. 3. (Mar. 1923), pp. 224–226.
 Brown, J. Ward. "American Secondary School Fraternities" Published by the Maske Brown Company, New York, Copyright 1913. 213 pages with a 16-page supplement, June 1914.
 Baird, William Raymond. "American College Fraternities" Fourth edition, copyright 1890. Published by James P. Downs, New York. Pages 287–288.

The Record, West Philadelphia High School yearbook. 1990